Namaro is a village and rural commune in Niger.

It is the birthplace of Salou Djibo, who took power in Niger in a military coup in February 2010.

References

Communes of Tillabéri Region
Tillabéri Region